The Juilliard String Quartet is a classical music string quartet founded in 1946 at the Juilliard School in New York by William Schuman. Since its inception, it has been the quartet-in-residence at the Juilliard School. It has received numerous awards, including four Grammys and membership in the National Academy of Recording Arts and Sciences Hall of Fame. In February 2011, the group received the NARAS Lifetime Achievement Award for its outstanding contributions to recorded classical music.

As of 2022, the quartet's members are violinists Areta Zhulla and Ronald Copes, violist Molly Carr, and cellist Astrid Schween.

History

Robert Mann era: 1946–1996 
The quartet was founded by Juilliard School president William Schuman and violin faculty member Robert "Bobby" Mann in 1946. The original members were Mann and violinist Robert Koff, violist Raphael Hillyer and cellist Arthur Winograd. It began recording with Columbia Records upon its founding. Between March and August 1949, the quartet became the first group to record Béla Bartók's complete string quartets. Columbia released the recordings in 1950. Around the time of its public and recording debuts, the Juilliard Quartet quickly established itself as a premier American ensemble on the international level.   

In 1953, the group was the first to record Arnold Schoenberg's complete quartets. In 1955, Claus Adam replaced Winograd as the group's cellist. In 1958, Isidore Cohen replaced Koff as second violinist.  

In 1962, the Juilliard String Quartet replaced the Budapest String Quartet as the Library of Congress's quartet in residence. That year, the quartet performed at the Library with a set of Stradivarius instruments Gertrude Clarke Whittall donated in the 1930s. In 1966, Earl Carlyss replaced Cohen as second violinist and three years later, Samuel Rhodes replaced Hillyer. 

In 1974, Joel Krosnick replaced his teacher Adam as the cellist. By 1981, the Juilliard Quartet was said to have performed in over 3,000 concerts in 43 different countries. In 1986, Joel Smirnoff replaced Carlyss as second violinist.

In 1996, Mann announced his intention to retire. He played his last concert as a member of the quartet at the Tanglewood Music Festival that year. Smirnoff took over as first violinist and Ronald Copes joined the group as second violinist.

21st century: 1997–present 
In 2005, the quartet performed in Madrid for Queen Sofía of Spain on the set of Stradivarius Palatinos instruments owned by the Royal Palace of Madrid. In 2009, Nick Eanet replaced Smirnoff as first violinist. He left the group in 2010 for health reasons and was replaced by Joseph Lin.

In 2013, Roger Tapping replaced Rhodes as violist. In 2015, the quartet released an app for Apple's iOS called "Juilliard String Quartet – An Exploration of Schubert’s Death and the Maiden". Ulysses Arts issued the recording separately. The London-based app developer Touchpress and the Juilliard School co-produced the app, which features the quartet in a performance of Franz Schubert’s String Quartet No. 14 in D minor ("Death and the Maiden"). A year later, Astrid Schween replaced Krosnick as cellist, becoming the quartet's first female member. Areta Zhulla then replaced Lin as first violinist. After Tapping's death in 2022, Molly Carr became the quartet's new violist.

Repertoire 
The quartet plays a wide range of classical music, and has recorded works by Beethoven, Mendelssohn, Bartók, Debussy and Shostakovich, among others, while also promoting more contemporary composers such as Elliott Carter, Ralph Shapey, Henri Dutilleux and Milton Babbitt. It has performed with other noted musicians, such as Aaron Copland, Glenn Gould, Benita Valente and also (in its early days) the scientist Albert Einstein. It can be heard on the soundtrack of the movie Immortal Beloved. By the early 1990s, the quartet was said to have produced more than 100 recordings and performed over 500 unique works.

Members

First violin

1946 Robert Mann
1997 Joel Smirnoff
2009 Nick Eanet
2011 Joseph Lin
2018 Areta Zhulla

Second violin

1946 
1958 Isidore Cohen
1966 Earl Carlyss
1986 Joel Smirnoff
1997 Ronald Copes

Viola

1946 Raphael Hillyer
1969 
2013 Roger Tapping
2022 Molly Carr

Violoncello

1946 Arthur Winograd
1955 Claus Adam
1974 Joel Krosnick
2016

Teaching
Members of the Juilliard Quartet are also private teachers and chamber coaches at the Juilliard School and at music festivals worldwide. Musicians who have studied with the quartet have gone on to become members of the Tokyo, Emerson, Shanghai, LaSalle, Concord, Alexander, New World, Brentano, Lark, and the Ulysses string quartets among others.

Awards

Grammy Awards

References

External links
Juilliard String Quartet Juilliard String Quartet official site
Colbert Artists Management: Juilliard String Quartet

Musical groups established in 1946
American string quartets
Grammy Lifetime Achievement Award winners
Juilliard School faculty